Domanikoceras is monospecific genus of ammonoids that lived during the lower Frasnian stage of upper Devonian period and was named after Domanic Suite in the Timan (Russia). Compressed and smooth shell of these ammonoids had closed umbilicus. Suture was the same as in the gase of genus Tornoceras, while growth lines were similar to Cheiloceratidae, as they were strictly convex. The only species belonging to this genus is D. timidum and its name has been derived from Latin word timid (shy) because course of its aperture has protecting course.

References

Goniatitida genera
Tornoceratidae
Frasnian life